Rogério Tiago Lobato (born 25 July 1949) is an Timorese politician and former Interior Minister belonging to Fretilin. He was a founding member of the first independent government of East Timor, in 1975, led by Fretilin. He is also the brother of the late Nicolau Lobato, second President of the country who was killed in action after the Indonesian invasion, in late 1978.

In 2006 Rogério resigned as Minister over a dispute with the military over alleged discrimination. Lobato was jailed on five charges of arming civilians during the 2006 East Timorese crisis in March 2007 and sentenced seven and a half years in jail. The arming of civilians occurred after the country's police force had disintegrated, during a coup attempt.

In 2007, Rogério Lobato tried to leave the country to go to Malaysia for heart surgery resulting in a standoff at Dili Airport.

In 2008 president José Ramos-Horta reduced Lobato's jail sentence by half.

Lobato began his political career as part of Fretilin when it declared independence in November 1975. 3 December that year he departed East Timor with fellow Fretilin member Mari Alkatiri to promote the interests of the new country.  Following the Indonesian invasion of East Timor on 7 December, Lobato and Alkatiri stayed in Africa to campaign for the rights of their home country.

In late 2011 Rogério announced he would run as a candidate in the 2012 Presidential elections.

References

External links 
Report of the United Nations Independent Special Commission for East Timor, 2 October 2006

1949 births
Living people
Mambai people
Fretilin politicians
Government ministers of East Timor
East Timorese prisoners and detainees
Prisoners and detainees of East Timor